Pomaria, also known as the Summer–Huggins House, is a historic plantation house located near Pomaria, Newberry County, South Carolina.  It was built about 1825, and is a two-story, frame dwelling on a raised basement with Greek Revival and Federal style design elements. It features a two-story, projecting pedimented portico.  Also on the property are the contributing log smokehouse, a board and batten privy, and a Carpenter Gothic post office, which served as the first post office in the Dutch Fork. Pomaria Nurseries were begun on the plantation in 1840.

It was listed on the National Register of Historic Places in 1979.

References 

Plantation houses in South Carolina
Houses on the National Register of Historic Places in South Carolina
Federal architecture in South Carolina
Greek Revival houses in South Carolina
Houses completed in 1825
Houses in Newberry County, South Carolina
National Register of Historic Places in Newberry County, South Carolina